Balderton is a civil parish in the Newark and Sherwood district of Nottinghamshire, England.  The parish contains eight listed buildings that are recorded in the National Heritage List for England.   Of these, one is listed at Grade I, the highest of the three grades, and the others are at Grade II, the lowest grade.  The parish contains the village of Balderton and the surrounding area.  All the listed buildings are near the centre of the village, and consist of a church, structures associated with one of the churches, and five houses.


Key

Buildings

References

Citations

Sources

 

Lists of listed buildings in Nottinghamshire